Hypercompe atra is a moth of the family Erebidae first described by Charles Oberthür in 1881. It is found in Mexico.

References

atra
Moths described in 1881